The 1974 Southwest Texas State Bobcats football team was an American football team that represented Southwest Texas State University (now known as Texas State University) during the 1974 NAIA Division I football season as a member of the Lone Star Conference (LSC). In their tenth year under head coach Bill Miller, the team compiled an overall record of 6–4, with a mark of 6–3 in conference play.

Schedule

References

Southwest Texas State
Texas State Bobcats football seasons
Southwest Texas State Bobcats football